U.D.O. is a German heavy metal band founded by lead vocalist Udo Dirkschneider in 1987.

History
Following Udo Dirkschneider's departure from Accept in 1987, he formed his own band called U.D.O. He recruited guitarists Mathias Dieth and Peter Szigeti, bassist Frank Rittel and drummer Thomas Franke. They released their debut album titled Animal House on 3 November 1987, which was entirely written by Accept. They would tour with the likes of Guns N' Roses, Lita Ford and Zodiac Mindwarp. Rubach, Rittel and Franke departed the band, and guitarist Andy Susemihl, bassist Thomas Smuzyszki and drummer Stefan Schwarzmann joined. The follow-up album Mean Machine was released on 10 January 1989.

Susemihl left the band, with U.D.O. now as a four-piece. The band shifted to a lighter approach with the third album Faceless World, which was released on 25 February 1990, achieving great success; this being their best selling album so far. It was produced by former Accept drummer Stefan Kaufmann. The fourth album Timebomb was released on 3 April 1991. It was a more heavier album than their previous releases. In 1992, Dirkschneider put U.D.O. on hiatus to reunite with Accept.

In 1996, Dirkschneider reactivated U.D.O. with a brand new line-up; Stefan Kaufmann, now undertaking guitar duties, with guitarist Jürgen Graf and bassist Fitty Wienhold from Bullet, and Stefan Schwarzmann returning to the band. They took part in the 1997 compilation album A Tribute to Judas Priest: Legends of Metal, in which they recorded the song "Metal Gods".

On 24 March 1997, U.D.O. released the fifth album Solid. It was featured on the Rock Hard magazine reader charts for more than a year after its release. The album was followed up with No Limits on 20 April 1998, featuring a similar songwriting approach from Solid. The album features a cover of the Austrian pop band Supermax's hit single "Love Machine". After the conclusion of the band's tour, Stefan Schwarzmann quit the band. New drummer Lorenzo Milani replaced him.

The seventh album Holy was released on 18 October 1999, which received critical acclaim. It was a return to the guitar-driven sound similar to the Balls to the Wall-era Accept. A world tour followed with dates in the United States and several other major countries. The band known as Vanize, fronted by Udo Dirkschneider's brother Peter, supported U.D.O. during the tour. Line-up changes occurred during the second part of the tour with Gotthard guitarist Igor Gianola replacing Jürgen Graf. The tour spawned the first live album Live from Russia, which was released on 15 October 2001, a 2-CD release featuring many of the classic Accept songs that have since become staples of U.D.O.'s set.

On 24 July 2002, the eighth album Man and Machine was released, receiving a somewhat lukewarm reception. Despite standout songs such as the title track and "Private Eye", the album was ultimately less successful than Holy. It is notable for the song "Dancing with an Angel", featuring a duet performance of Dirkschneider and vocalist Doro Pesch.

U.D.O. released their ninth studio album Thunderball on 29 March 2004. The follow-up album Mission No. X was originally due for release on 4 October 2005, but was pushed forward by one week and was released on 30 September 2005 instead. It was the first album to feature Edge of Forever drummer Francesco Jovino.

On 18 May 2007, the eleventh album Mastercutor was released. In August 2007, bassist Fitty Weinhold was unable to perform with the band due to "private reasons". He would be temporarily replaced with former Majesty bassist Marcus Bielenberg for touring purposes.

U.D.O.'s twelfth studio album Dominator was released on 21 August 2009. The next studio album Rev-Raptor was originally due for release on 14 January 2011, but was delayed until 18 March 2011 due to the recurrence of Stefan Kaufmann's back problems. It was delayed again, but was officially released on 20 May 2011.

In September 2012, Kaufmann announced his departure for health reasons. He would continue to work in the surroundings of the band and produce for other bands in his own personal studio. On 15 January 2013, Russian guitarist Andrey Smirnov was recruited as the new member. A week later, Igor Gianola left the band "due to conflicts between band appointments and his private life and business." Following his departure, former Amberian Dawn guitarist Kasperi Heikkinen joined the band. The fourteenth album Steelhammer was released on 20 May 2013.

In December 2014, drummer Francesco Jovino left the band for personal reasons, joining Primal Fear in 2015. He was replaced by Udo Dirkschneider's son Sven in February 2015. U.D.O. released the fifteenth studio album Decadent on 23 January 2015.

In February 2017, Heikkinen announced his departure citing personal reasons. According to the band, no bad blood or drama were involved between the two. In March 2017, guitarist Bill Hudson was announced as the new member. On 24 April 2018, Hudson parted ways with the band "due to a difference in their individual visions for the future", according to Dirkschneider, adding that there was no "negative feelings on either side." In June 2018, Stefan Kaufmann temporarily rejoined the band only for the summer festival appearances until a new guitarist was found. The sixteenth album Steelfactory was released on 31 August 2018, with the first single "Rising High" being made available for streaming. On 19 September 2018, bassist Fitty Wienhold announced his departure from U.D.O., but stated that he would remain with the band if needed, " as a friend, as an advisor...whatever." The band soon recruited German guitarist Dee Dammers and Slovenian bassist Tilen Hudrap as their new members.

During U.D.O.'s touring in Europe in early 2019, Dirkschneider performed as a handicap after experiencing left knee pain. He vowed to continue without doctors' advice and without causing disappointment to the fans. The band was originally scheduled to perform at the Wacken Open Air festival in 2020 by performing Accept's 1985 album Metal Heart in its entirety to celebrate its 35th anniversary, with the addition of Das Musikkorps der Bundeswehr, but the festival was cancelled due to the COVID-19 pandemic. In 2020, U.D.O. collaborated with Das Musikkorps der Bundeswehr to record an album titled We Are One, which was released on 17 July 2020. It reached number 8 in the official German album charts, the second highest position for any U.D.O album in 34 years, right after Steelfactory, which peaked at number 7.

A live album titled Live In Bulgaria 2020 – Pandemic Survival Show was released on 19 March 2021. It was recorded live on 18 September 2020 in front of 2500 fans in Plovdiv. The seventeenth studio album Game Over was released on 22 October 2021.

Dirkschneider
U.D.O. performed under the name Dirkschneider for an occasion in which Udo Dirkschneider described as his "farewell to Accept", stating that he would no longer perform Accept songs again in the band's live shows. In early 2017, they performed in North America. A 2-CD live album titled Live: Back to the Roots was released on 28 October 2016. An updated version titled Live: Back to the Roots – Accepted! was released on 4 August 2017, featuring a DVD of their performance from Brno, Czech Republic.

The band continued to perform Accept songs for at least another year, due to the request from fans. They returned to North America in early 2018 after a positive reception from their first visit the previous year. In 2018, Udo Dirkschneider put his side project to a close as he did not want to cause confusion between his main band and his side project.

Discography

 Animal House (1987)
 Mean Machine (1989)
 Faceless World (1990)
 Timebomb (1991)
 Solid (1997)
 No Limits (1998)
 Holy (1999)
 Man and Machine (2002)
 Thunderball (2004)
 Mission No. X (2005)
 Mastercutor (2007)
 Dominator (2009)
 Rev-Raptor (2011)
 Steelhammer (2013)
 Decadent (2015)
 Steelfactory (2018)
 Game Over (2021)

Band members

Current members
 Udo Dirkschneider – vocals 
 Andrey Smirnov – guitars 
 Sven Dirkschneider – drums 
 Dee Dammers – guitars

See also 
 Darxon
 Kreator
 Sinner
 Gravestone
 Saxon
 Teutonic thrash metal

References

External links 

 
 
 Interview with Udo Dirkschneider @ Metalpaths.com (2011)

1987 establishments in Germany
German heavy metal musical groups
Musical groups from North Rhine-Westphalia
Musical groups established in 1987
GUN Records artists